Château de Sorel was a castle in Sorel-Moussel, Eure-et-Loir, France.

History
A motte-and-bailey castle was built in the 10th century to protect against Viking raids. The castle was located on a promontory overlooking the Eure River.   

The castle was fortified with a stone keep and ramparts. Philippe de Dreux, bishop-count of Beauvais, destroyed the castle in the 12th century. It was later rebuilt and strengthened. The Catholic League destroyed the castle  in the 16th century, later being rebuilt in the 17th century.

References

Source 
The World of the French Chateau - Château de Sorel

See also 
List of châteaux in Eure-et-Loir

Further reading
Notice sur le château de Sorel par Ed. Lefèvre, Mémoires de la Société archéologique d'Eure-et-Loir, tome 1. Société archéologique d'Eure-et-Loir, 1858, p.17 à 38.

Châteaux in Eure-et-Loir